Russian–Chinese Winter Youth Games is a regional winter sports competition, where China and Russia are the participants of the games. The first edition of the games was held in Harbin, China's Heilongjiang province in 2016, while the latest and third edition is scheduled to be held in December 2022.

Sports
Alpine skiing
Cross-country skiing
Curling
Figure skating
Freestyle skiing
Short-track speed skating
Snowboarding
Speed skating

Former
Ice hockey

Editions
 Harbin, China (2016): 2016 Russian–Chinese Winter Youth Games
 Ufa, Russia (2018): 2018 Russian–Chinese Winter Youth Games
 Changchun, China (2022): 2022 Russian–Chinese Winter Youth Games

Medal table
The medal table is as listed as follows:

References

2016 establishments in China
2016 establishments in Russia
Recurring sporting events established in 2016
Asian youth sports competitions
European youth sports competitions
Multi-sport events in Asia
Multi-sport events in Europe
Winter sports competitions in China
Winter multi-sport events in Russia
Youth sport in China
Youth sport in Russia
Youth curling
Youth ice hockey